Horsegirl is an American rock band from Chicago, Illinois. The band members are Nora Cheng, Penelope Lowenstein, and Gigi Reece. The group is currently signed to Matador Records. The group originated in 2019 and they self-released their first song, "Forecast", that year. The group released their first EP, Horsegirl: Ballroom Dance Scene et cetera, through Sonic Cathedral Recordings in 2020. Paste named the EP one of the 25 best EP's of 2020.

In November 2021, the group released another song, "Billy", their first on Matador Records. The song was named one of Rolling Stones "Songs You Need to Know". Alongside the song, the group released a cover of Minutemen's song "History Lesson – Part II".

On June 3, 2022 the band released their debut album, Versions of Modern Performance, via Matador.

Discography
Albums
Versions of Modern Performance (2022)
Rough Trade Super-Disc (2022)

EPs
Horsegirl: Ballroom Dance Scene (2020)

Singles
"Forecast" (2019)
"Sea Life Sandwich Boy" (2020)
"Ballroom Dance Scene" (2020)
"Billy" (2021)
"Anti-Glory" (2022)
"World of Pots and Pans" (2022)
"Dirtbag Transformation (Still Dirty)" (2022)
"History Lesson - Part II" (2022)

References

Matador Records artists
Musical groups from Chicago
All-female bands
Rock music groups from Illinois
Indie rock musical groups from Illinois
American post-punk music groups
American shoegaze musical groups
Noise pop musical groups
Musical groups established in 2019